Murray Run is a stream in the U.S. state of Pennsylvania. It is a tributary to Standing Stone Creek.

Murray Run has the name of a pioneer citizen.

References

Rivers of Pennsylvania
Rivers of Huntingdon County, Pennsylvania